Live: Right Here, Right Now. is the first live album by American rock band Van Halen, released in 1993. It is the band's only live album featuring Sammy Hagar and the only live album by Van Halen until the release of Tokyo Dome Live in Concert in 2015.

History
The album combines songs performed over two nights in May 1992 at the Selland Arena in Fresno, California. Most of the songs on the album were from the first night, such as the solos performed by Eddie Van Halen and Sammy Hagar. There is much debate as to whether or not the songs on this album have been doctored in the studio, as the original 1992 broadcast of the concert was much more raw and unmixed, sounding truer to the band's live sound than the recording that was ultimately released. Sammy Hagar confirms in his book, Red, My Uncensored Life in Rock that he had to "go into the studio vocal booth at 5150 with a video of the concert playing on a TV and had to re-sing the whole show". This was due to the brothers correcting things in post production that either changed the speed of his vocals or the key he was in.

The album contained only four David Lee Roth-era songs (including Van Halen's arrangement of "You Really Got Me" by The Kinks), and two songs from Sammy Hagar solo years. It also featured drum and bass solos and a cover of a song by The Who, one of the band's influences. As was the case with all tours with Hagar, the band focused on songs from the new album, Hagar's solo material and covers. The then-current album For Unlawful Carnal Knowledge is very well represented, with ten of the eleven songs originally featured on that album. ("The Dream Is Over" was the only track not included on the album, but it was included on the DVD release.)

The album cover photo was taken in June 1988, after a tornado touched down in Smyrna, Delaware.

Recording
Most of the tracks were recorded at the 1992 Fresno shows, as evidenced by both a 1992 Westwood One radio presentation and the DVD live video release. Studio fixes, however, were admittedly present on the album. Says Hagar,

Roth-era representation
Sammy Hagar sang four David Lee Roth era Van Halen songs on the album, "Panama" and "Jump" from 1984, and "Ain't Talkin' 'Bout Love" and "You Really Got Me" from Van Halen. "You Really Got Me" is stopped before the 2 minute mark and starts "Cabo Wabo", a Hagar-era song. "You Really Got Me" picks up again when "Cabo Wabo" is finished, thus making the two songs one track on the album.

Also, during the "316" track, Eddie plays portions of three instrumentals from the Roth-led years. They include "Cathedral" from Diver Down, "Eruption" from Van Halen and the intro to "Mean Street" from Fair Warning.

The "Ultra Bass" track is Michael Anthony's bass solo, occasionally accompanied by Alex Van Halen's drums. During his solo, Anthony plays a portion of the Fair Warning track "Sunday Afternoon in the Park", which originally was a keyboard track performed by Eddie.

Track listing
All songs credited to Sammy Hagar, Edward Van Halen, Michael Anthony and Alex Van Halen except where noted.

On the German and Japanese versions of the album and in the Van Halen Box: 1986–1993 (only available in Japan), a bonus disc is included which includes the B-sides to the "Jump" single.

"Eagles Fly" (Hagar) – 6:03 (Sammy Hagar solo song, from I Never Said Goodbye) (appears on the Live: Right Here, Right Now. video album)
"Mine All Mine" – 5:27 (from OU812)  (recorded in Tokyo on February 2, 1989, as part of the OU812 Tour)

† denotes a single

Home video

The footage was filmed with 15 cameras over two nights, May 14 and 15, 1992 and mixed together by editor Mitchell Sinoway, with the bulk of the footage and music coming from the second night. The DVD is single-sided but dual-layer format, running approximately 120 minutes long. The only non-musical items are optional subtitles or closed captioning (DVD) plus a brief clip of each performer (not in concert) talking about music in general. 15 of the songs here were part of the 27 recordings from the live double-CD album with the addition of two songs which were not on the audio album: "The Dream Is Over" and "Eagles Fly".

Track listing
"Poundcake" – 5:28
"Judgement Day" – 4:52
"Man on a Mission" – 4:49
"When It's Love" – 5:22
"In 'n' Out" – 6:20
"Right Now" – 6:13
"Ultra Bass" – 5:15
"Pleasure Dome/Drum Solo" – 9:38
"Spanked" – 5:08
"Runaround" – 5:21
"Finish What Ya Started" – 5:50
"Eagles Fly" (Hagar) – 6:03
"316" – 11:37
"You Really Got Me/Cabo Wabo" (Ray Davies / Anthony / Hagar / A. Van Halen / E. Van Halen) – 7:58
"The Dream Is Over"
"Jump" (Anthony / Roth / A. Van Halen / E. Van Halen) – 4:26
"Top of the World" – 4:59

Personnel
Van Halen
Eddie Van Halen – lead guitar, keyboards, background vocals
Alex Van Halen – drums, percussion
Sammy Hagar – lead vocals, rhythm guitar
Michael Anthony – bass guitar, background vocals

Additional personnel
Alan Fitzgerald – keyboards, background vocals (offstage, credited as "Eddie's keyboard tech")

Technical
Producers: Van Halen, Andy Johns
Live Recording Engineer: Biff Dawes
Mobile Recording Facility: Westwood One Mobile Studio
Mixing: Andy Johns
Mixing assistant: Rail Jon Rogut
Art direction: Jeri Heiden
Design: Lyn Bradley, Jeri Heiden
Photography: David Graham, John Halpern, Mark Seliger

Charts

Album

Singles

Certification
Audio

1993 VHS

|-

References

Van Halen live albums
Van Halen video albums
Albums produced by Andy Johns
1993 live albums
Warner Records live albums
Live video albums
Warner Records video albums
1993 video albums